Ismayil Mammadov (born 5 August 1976) is an Azerbaijani footballer who plays for FK Karvan.

External links
 

Azerbaijani footballers
Azerbaijan international footballers
1976 births
Living people
FK Standard Sumgayit players
MOIK Baku players
Association football midfielders
FK Genclerbirliyi Sumqayit players